James C. Hayes (May 25, 1946 – June 9, 2022) was an American politician who served as the mayor of Fairbanks, Alaska, the first African-American mayor in the state of Alaska.

Biography
Hayes was born in Sacramento, California, the son of Juanita (née Metoyer) and Caustella Hayes. In 1955, his family moved to Fairbanks and in 1965, he graduated from Lathrop High School in Fairbanks. In 1970, he earned a B.A. in education with minors in Sociology and Psychology from the University of Alaska.

Personal life
In 1974, he married Chris Parham; they had two children, LaNene Hayes-Scott and James Hayes Jr. He was a member of the Church of God in Christ.

Hayes died on June 9, 2022, at the age of 76.

References

1946 births
2022 deaths
21st-century American politicians
African-American people in Alaska politics
Alaska city council members
Mayors of Fairbanks, Alaska
African-American mayors in Alaska
Politicians from Sacramento, California
21st-century African-American politicians
20th-century African-American people
Lathrop High School (Alaska) alumni
University of Alaska alumni